Sanford Clark (October 24, 1935 – July 4, 2021) was an American country-rockabilly singer and guitarist, best known for his 1956 hit "The Fool".

Biography
Clark was born in Tulsa, Oklahoma, and was raised in Phoenix, Arizona, from the age of 9. He first began performing in the Phoenix area in the early 1950s. He spent time in the Air Force in the South Pacific; he formed a band there which won a talent show in Hawaii. Returning to Phoenix, he and his friend Al Casey met Lee Hazlewood, then a local DJ. Clark, with Casey on guitar, recorded one of Hazlewood's songs, "The Fool",  in Floyd Ramsey's Audio Recorders studio on MCI Records in 1956. Dot Records picked the song up for national distribution after a Philadelphia deejay tipped them off to it. The song became a hit in the U.S., peaking at No. 14 on the Country Singles chart, No. 5 on the R&B Singles chart, and No. 7 on the Billboard Top 100. Following the song's success, Clark opened on tour for Ray Price and Roy Orbison.

Clark's 1957 follow-up single, "The Cheat", gave him a second minor hit, peaking at No. 74 Pop. He and Dot Records' owner Randy Wood quarreled over the singer's image, and he eventually signed to Jamie Records in 1958, continuing to work with Hazlewood. In 1959 Clark recorded a song, "Son of a Gun", about the son of a western gunslinger. This song is also referenced in Keith Richards' book Life, published in October 2010. He credits the song as being one of the first songs he learned and performed on stage prior to forming the Rolling Stones.

Moving to Hollywood, he recorded for several other labels and had several almost-comebacks; his 1964 version of Hazlewood's "Houston" was eclipsed by Dean Martin's version, and in 1965 he re-recorded "The Fool" with Waylon Jennings on guitar. Hazlewood, by now an established songwriter, signed Clark to his own label, LHI, on which Clark released "The Black Widow" b/w "The Son of Hickory Holler's Tramp" in 1967, and "Farm Labor Camp #2" and the album Return of the Fool in 1968.

A few years later Clark left the music business and worked in construction, though he occasionally recorded in later decades on his own label, Desert Sun Records.

Clark’s publicist and fellow performer, Johnny Vallis, said that Clark died at Mercy Hospital in Joplin, Missouri, where he had been receiving cancer treatment before contracting COVID-19 during the COVID-19 pandemic in Missouri, according to NewsTalk KZRG radio.

TV and film 
Clark's most popular and well-known song, "The Fool", was featured in the Netflix film Win It All (2017) and the Focus Features film Dallas Buyers Club (2013). His song "Calling All Hearts" has been played in various TV and film productions including the NBC series Aquarius: Episode 107, the ABC series Nashville: Episode 310, the FXX series It's Always Sunny in Philadelphia: Episode 1209, and in the 20th Century Fox film, Walking With Dinosaurs (2013). His song "The Big Lie" was featured in the FX series Justified: Episode 409, in the Freestyle Releasing film From the Rough (2011), and in Sony Pictures Home Entertainment film The Driftless Area (2015). "Bad Case of You" was featured in the Amazon Studios series Transparent episodes 308 and 310.

Discography

1950s

1960s

1970s

1980s

1990s

2010s

Unknown date

References

External links
Rockabilly Hall of Fame entry
 
 

1935 births
2021 deaths
Musicians from Tulsa, Oklahoma
American country singer-songwriters
American rockabilly musicians
Country musicians from Oklahoma
Dot Records artists
Singer-songwriters from Oklahoma
Deaths from the COVID-19 pandemic in Missouri